Nile University (NU) (Arabic: جامعة النيل) is the first non-profit, research and entrepreneurial university in Egypt. Founded in July 2006 with the support of the Egyptian Ministry of Communications and Information Technology. The university has undergraduate programs and graduate programs alongside its research centers. It is located in Juhayna Square on 26 July Corridor, Sheikh Zayed, Giza.
It includes 5 Schools: School of Engineering and Applied Sciences, School of Information Technology and Computer Science, School of Business Administration, School of Biotechnology, Graduate School of Management of Technology.

History 
Nile University (NU) was established in 2006 (Presidential Decree # 255/2006), officially inaugurated in January 2007 and became a non-governmental autonomously managed (Ahleya) university in 2014 (Presidential Decree # 123/2014). NU is the first national, non-profit university in Egypt conceived to be a leader in technology and business education in Egypt and the Middle East/North Africa (MENA) region. Its programs and research centers are designed to address critical areas of vital importance to the economic growth and prosperity of the people of Egypt and the region and to engage in cutting-edge applied research. It also maintains strong collaborations with leading academic and business institutions locally, regionally and worldwide.

Nile University's goal is to be a world-class institution of learning committed to excellence in education, research, entrepreneurship, and innovation. The university offers both undergraduate and graduate programs in various fields. Its business and technology-based programs and research centers are designed to address critical areas of vital importance to the economic growth and prosperity of the people of Egypt and the region and to engage in cutting-edge research.

The development of Nile University dates to the turn of the century when a group of community leaders foresaw the need to establish a leading-edge non-profit university dedicated to the advancement of higher education and applied research in selected sectors of strategic importance to the economy. Egypt has a growing need for technically capable and well-qualified personnel, who are educated and trained to meet development demands in a dynamically changing global marketplace. Enhancing the nation's technological resources, particularly in highly skilled areas, is critical to the country's goal of sustainable economic growth.

While Egypt has a solid academic sector, it still lacks a world-class research university capable of meeting industry challenges in high technology sectors. This is the role Nile University seeks to play. Further, the National Telecommunications and Information Technology Strategic Plan calls for building an IT society that copes with worldwide developments and advancements in technology in order to accelerate economic and social growth. The main goal of this plan is intended to bridge the digital gap between Egypt and highly developed industrial nations. Nile University serves the dual purpose of capacity building in targeted sectors and leading applied research in collaboration with the ICT community and other critical industrial sectors. To that effect, it is essential to link academia, industry, and government; Nile University was conceived with this philosophy in mind.

Schools with undergraduate programs

School of Engineering and Applied Sciences 
Architecture and Urban Design
Civil and Infrastructure Engineering and Management
Electronics and Computer Engineering
Industrial Engineering
Mechanical Engineering

School of Information Technology and Computer Science 
Computer Science Program
Artificial Intelligence Program
Biomedical Informatics Program

School of Business Administration 
Economics
Supply Chain and Logistics 
General Business and Entrepreneurship 
Finance
Integrated Marketing Communication

School of Biotechnology 
Applied Biotechnology
Bioinformatics

Schools with postgraduate programs

Graduate School of Management of Technology (MOT) 
Ph.D. in Management of Technology
M.Sc. in Management of Technology
Diploma in Management of Technology

School of Engineering and Applied Sciences (EAS) 
Master of Science in Mechatronics Engineering
Master of Microelectronics System Design

School of Business Administration (BA) 
Executive Master of Business Administration (EMBA)
Master of Science and Professional Diploma in Banking and Finance (MBF)
MBA/EMBA Dual Degree

School of Information Technology and Computer Science (ITCS) 
Ph.D. in informatics 
Ph.D. in Information Security 
Ph.D. in Software Engineering 
M.Sc. in informatics 
M.Sc. in Information Security 
M.Sc. in Software Engineering 
Bioinformatics Diploma 
Big Data and Data Science Diploma 
Computational Drug Discovery and Development Professional Diploma (C3D)

Research centers 
Smart Engineering Systems Center
Center for Informatics Science
Wireless Intelligent Networks Center
Nano-Electronics Integrated Systems Center
 Innovation, Entrepreneurship and Competitiveness Center

References 

Education in 6th of October (city)
Educational institutions established in 2006
Buildings and structures in Giza Governorate
Universities in Egypt
2006 establishments in Egypt
Research institutes in Egypt
Science and technology in Egypt
Nanotechnology centers in Egypt